The Sudayev AS-44 (Avtomat Sudayeva, Автома́т Суда́ева) is a Soviet automatic rifle that was designed in 1944 by Alexey Sudayev.  It was produced in limited numbers and tested during 1945, but its development ended in 1946 due to the death of its designer.

History
In 1943 the Soviet M43 7.62x41mm intermediate cartridge was developed and provided to Soviet small arms design bureaus to design a series of new weapons around this new cartridge. A design competition was announced and at least ten different designs were submitted for testing from designers such as Fedorov, Tokarev, Simonov, and Shpagin. In May 1944 Alexey Sudayev who had already designed the successful PPS submachine gun delivered the first and fourth models of his AS-44 for tests. The AS-44 successfully met the competition's requirements and in the spring of 1945, an experimental batch of AS-44 assault rifles was manufactured at the Tula Arms Factory. During the summer of 1945, these were sent for testing in the Moscow, Leningrad, Central Asian, and Transcaucasian military districts. The tests determined the AS-44 was reliable, but not as accurate, or long ranged as the Mosin-Nagant rifle currently in service. When fired from its integrated bi-pod its range and accuracy were judged to be superior to that of sub-machine guns in Soviet service. In spite of positive evaluations, the AS-44 was not approved for mass production at that time. The next set of modifications and trials would have started in early 1946 but Sudayev became ill and died on August 17, 1946, which prevented this from occurring.

Description
Sudayev built seven different prototypes with slightly different weight, length, and features for the design competition.  The layout of the AS-44 was similar to the what would be AK 47 with a fixed wooden stock, wooden pistol grip, adjustable rear sight, curved detachable 30 round en-block magazine, wooden fore stock, metal bi-pod, gun barrel, top mounted gas cylinder, hooded front sight, flash suppressor and bayonet mount.  The AS-44 made use of stamped components to reduce production costs and speed production.

 The first prototype was a self-loading, selective-fire weapon capable of both single or multiple-shots, the cocking handle and combination safety/selector switch were on the left hand side of the receiver towards the rear.  The first six prototypes used a tilting bolt which was pioneered by the Czechoslovaks in the ZB vz. 26 machine gun, and also used in the StG 44.
 The second prototype had a revised gas chamber and the cocking handle was moved to the right hand side above the magazine. There was a collapsible wooden pistol grip and the fire selector switch and safety were moved inside the front of the trigger guard.
 The third prototype was a fully automatic weapon without a fire selector. The dust cover on the right hand side was modified with two notches to provide a safety catch for the cocking handle while on the march. The barrel lacked a flash suppressor but it had three ports per side of the barrel in front of the front sight to act as a muzzle brake and there was no bayonet mount.
 The fourth, fifth and sixth prototypes differed from the third in that there was no muzzle brake, the safety and fire selector switches were moved to the left hand side of the receiver above the trigger guard. There were also bi-pod and bayonet mounts.
 In October 1945, Sudayev presented a lightened version based on his fourth model for testing. The seventh prototype used a gas-delayed blowback action. Although lighter due to the deletion of its bi-pod its recoil, accuracy, and durability were negatively affected.

See also
 7.62×39mm
 AK-47
 Assault weapon
 List of Russian inventions
 List of Russian weaponry
 List of assault rifles
 MKb 42(H)
 MKb 42(W)
 PPS submachine gun
 StG 44
 Table of handgun and rifle cartridges

References

External links
 AS-44 / Internet Movie Firearms Database

7.62×39mm assault rifles
Tula Arms Plant products
Trial and research firearms of the Soviet Union
Assault rifles of the Soviet Union